Abominable may refer to:

 Abominable (2006 film), an American monster film by Ryan Schifrin
 Abominable (2019 film), a computer-animated adventure film

See also 
 
 Abomination (disambiguation)